Laneros (often stylized as LANeros) is a digital community of over 390,000 members worldwide, mostly of Hispanic countries, started in 1999.  Its slogan is "Digital Addiction".
The name comes from the so-called LAN (Local area network) parties, which were where the founders gathered to play videogames 20 years ago, and would translate to English as "LANners".

References

External links 

Colombian entertainment websites
Technology websites